Dragan Arsenović (Serbian Cyrillic: Драган Арсеновић; 6 October 1952 – 7 March 2004) was a Serbian footballer.

References

External links
 Profile at Crno-bela nostalgija

1952 births
2004 deaths
Serbian footballers
Yugoslav footballers
Sportspeople from Šabac
Yugoslav First League players
FK Mačva Šabac players
FK Partizan players
FK Rad players
Association football defenders